Mimacraea maesseni, the Maessen's acraea mimic, is a butterfly in the family Lycaenidae. It is found in Ghana (the Volta region), Togo and southern Nigeria. The habitat consists of forests.

References

Butterflies described in 2000
Poritiinae